Villé is a commune in the Bas-Rhin department and Grand Est region of north-eastern France.

See also
 Communes of the Bas-Rhin department

References

Bas-Rhin communes articles needing translation from French Wikipedia
Communes of Bas-Rhin